Shamshad Hussain (1946 – 24 October 2015) was an Indian artist and the son of M. F. Husain.

Early life
Shamshad was born in Mumbai in 1946.

He attended Baroda College of Fine Arts, where he studied a diploma in painting. He then studied at the Royal College of Art, Hussain claims that his time there "changed my perspective about art".

Career
His first solo exhibition took place in 1968. It was at this exhibition that he sold his first painting for 50 Rs.

Awards
In 1983, Shamshad won the Lalit Kala Academy national award.

References

20th-century Indian painters
1946 births
2015 deaths
Artists from Mumbai
Painters from Maharashtra